

Events

Pre-1600
1400 – The Trần dynasty of Vietnam is deposed, after one hundred and seventy-five years of rule, by Hồ Quý Ly, a court official.
1540 – Waltham Abbey is surrendered to King Henry VIII of England; the last religious community to be closed during the Dissolution of the Monasteries.
1568 – The Peace of Longjumeau is signed, ending the second phase of the French Wars of Religion.

1601–1900
1775 – American Revolutionary War: Patrick Henry delivers his speech – "Give me liberty, or give me death!" – at St. John's Episcopal Church, Richmond, Virginia.
1801 – Tsar Paul I of Russia is struck with a sword, then strangled, and finally trampled to death inside his bedroom at St. Michael's Castle.
1806 – After traveling through the Louisiana Purchase and reaching the Pacific Ocean, explorers Lewis and Clark and their "Corps of Discovery" begin their arduous journey home.
1821 – Greek War of Independence: Battle and fall of city of Kalamata.
1839 – A massive earthquake destroys the former capital Inwa of the Konbaung dynasty, present-day Myanmar.
1848 – The ship John Wickliffe arrives at Port Chalmers carrying the first Scottish settlers for Dunedin, New Zealand. Otago province is founded.
1857 – Elisha Otis's first elevator is installed at 488 Broadway New York City.
1862 – American Civil War: The First Battle of Kernstown, Virginia, marks the start of Stonewall Jackson's Valley Campaign. Although a Confederate defeat, the engagement distracts Federal efforts to capture Richmond.
1868 – The University of California is founded in Oakland, California when the Organic Act is signed into law.
1879 – War of the Pacific: The Battle of Topáter, the first battle of the war is fought between Chile and the joint forces of Bolivia and Peru.
1885 – Sino-French War: Chinese victory in the Battle of Phu Lam Tao near Hưng Hóa, northern Vietnam.
1888 – In England, The Football League, the world's oldest professional association football league, meets for the first time.
1889 – The Ahmadiyya Muslim Community is established by Mirza Ghulam Ahmad in Qadian, British India.

1901–present
1901 – Emilio Aguinaldo, only President of the First Philippine Republic, is captured at Palanan, Isabela by the forces of General Frederick Funston.
1905 – Eleftherios Venizelos calls for Crete's union with Greece, and begins what is to be known as the Theriso revolt.
1909 – Theodore Roosevelt leaves New York for a post-presidency safari in Africa. The trip is sponsored by the Smithsonian Institution and National Geographic Society.
1913 – A tornado outbreak kills more than 240 people in the central United States, while an ongoing flood in the Ohio River watershed was killing 650 people.
1918 – First World War: On the third day of the German Spring Offensive, the 10th Battalion of the Royal West Kent Regiment is annihilated with many of the men becoming prisoners of war
1919 – In Milan, Italy, Benito Mussolini founds his Fascist political movement.
1931 – Bhagat Singh, Shivaram Rajguru and Sukhdev Thapar are hanged for the killing of a deputy superintendent of police during the Indian independence movement.
1933 – The Reichstag passes the Enabling Act of 1933, making Adolf Hitler dictator of Germany.
1935 – Signing of the Constitution of the Commonwealth of the Philippines.
1939 – The Hungarian air force attacks the headquarters of the Slovak air force in Spišská Nová Ves, killing 13 people and beginning the Slovak–Hungarian War.
1940 – The Lahore Resolution (Qarardad-e-Pakistan or Qarardad-e-Lahore) is put forward at the Annual General Convention of the All-India Muslim League.
1956 – Pakistan becomes the first Islamic republic in the world. This date is now celebrated as Republic Day in Pakistan.
1965 – NASA launches Gemini 3, the United States' first two-man space flight (crew: Gus Grissom and John Young).
1977 – The first of The Nixon Interviews (12 will be recorded over four weeks) is videotaped with British journalist David Frost interviewing former United States President Richard Nixon about the Watergate scandal and the Nixon tapes.
1978 – The first UNIFIL troops arrived in Lebanon for peacekeeping mission along the Blue Line.
1980 – Archbishop Óscar Romero of El Salvador gives his famous speech appealing to men of the El Salvadoran armed forces to stop killing the Salvadorans.
1982 – Guatemala's government, headed by Fernando Romeo Lucas García is overthrown in a military coup by right-wing General Efraín Ríos Montt.
1983 – Strategic Defense Initiative: President Ronald Reagan makes his initial proposal to develop technology to intercept enemy missiles.
1988 – Angolan and Cuban forces defeat South Africa in the Battle of Cuito Cuanavale.
1991 – The Revolutionary United Front, with support from the special forces of Charles Taylor's National Patriotic Front of Liberia, invades Sierra Leone in an attempt to overthrow Joseph Saidu Momoh, sparking the 11-year Sierra Leone Civil War.
1994 – At an election rally in Tijuana, Mexican presidential candidate Luis Donaldo Colosio is assassinated by Mario Aburto Martínez.
  1994   – A United States Air Force (USAF) F-16 aircraft collides with a USAF C-130 at Pope Air Force Base and then crashes, killing 24 United States Army soldiers on the ground. This later became known as the Green Ramp disaster.
  1994   – Aeroflot Flight 593 crashed into the Kuznetsk Alatau mountain, Kemerovo Oblast, Russia, killing 75.
1996 – Taiwan holds its first direct elections and chooses Lee Teng-hui as President.
1999 – Gunmen assassinate Paraguay's Vice President Luis María Argaña.
2001 – The Russian Mir space station is disposed of, breaking up in the atmosphere before falling into the southern Pacific Ocean near Fiji.
2003 – Battle of Nasiriyah, first major conflict during the invasion of Iraq.
2008 – Official opening of Rajiv Gandhi International Airport in Hyderabad, India 
2009 – FedEx Express Flight 80: A McDonnell Douglas MD-11 flying from Guangzhou, China crashes at Tokyo's Narita International Airport, killing both the captain and the co-pilot.
2010 – The Affordable Care Act becomes law in the United States.
2018 – President of Peru Pedro Pablo Kuczynski resigns from the presidency amid a mass corruption scandal before certain impeachment by the opposition-majority Congress of Peru.
2019 – The Kazakh capital of Astana was renamed to Nur-Sultan.
  2019   – The US-backed Syrian Democratic Forces capture the town of Baghuz in Eastern Syria, declaring military victory over the Islamic State of Iraq and the Levant after four years of fighting, although the group maintains a scattered presence and sleeper cells across Syria and Iraq.
2020 – Prime Minister Boris Johnson put the United Kingdom into its first national lockdown in response to COVID-19.
2021 – A container ship runs aground and obstructs the Suez Canal for six days.

Births

Pre-1600
1338 – Emperor Go-Kōgon of Japan (d. 1374)
1430 – Margaret of Anjou (d. 1482)
1514 – Lorenzino de' Medici, Italian writer and assassin (d. 1548)
1599 – Thomas Selle, German composer (d. 1663)

1601–1900
1614 – Jahanara Begum, Mughal princess (d. 1681)
1643 – Mary of Jesus de León y Delgado, Spanish Dominican lay sister and mystic (d. 1731)
1699 – John Bartram, American botanist and explorer (d. 1777)
1732 – Princess Marie Adélaïde of France (d. 1800)
1749 – Pierre-Simon Laplace, French mathematician and astronomer (d. 1827)
1750 – Johannes Matthias Sperger, Austrian bassist and composer (d. 1812)
1754 – Jurij Vega, Slovene mathematician, physicist and artillery officer (d. 1802)
1769 – Augustin Daniel Belliard, French general and diplomat (d. 1832)
  1769   – William Smith, English geologist and cartographer (d. 1839)
1823 – Schuyler Colfax, American journalist and politician, 17th Vice President of the United States (d. 1885)
1826 – Ludwig Minkus, Austrian violinist and composer (d. 1917)
1834 – Julius Reubke, German pianist and composer (d. 1858)
1838 – Marie Adam-Doerrer, Swiss women's rights activist and unionist (d. 1908)
1842 – Friedrich Amelung, Estonian-German historian, businessman and composer (d. 1909)
  1842   – Susan Jane Cunningham, American mathematician (d. 1921)
1858 – Ludwig Quidde, German activist and politician, Nobel Prize laureate (d. 1941)
 1860 – Horatio Bottomley, British politician and businessman (d. 1933)
1862 – Nathaniel Reed, American criminal (d. 1950)
1868 – Dietrich Eckart, German journalist and politician (d. 1923)
1869 – Calouste Gulbenkian, Turkish-Armenian businessman and philanthropist (d. 1955)
1872 – Michael Joseph Savage, Australian-New Zealand union leader and politician, 23rd Prime Minister of New Zealand (d. 1940)
1874 – Grantley Goulding, English hurdler (d. 1947)
  1874   – J. C. Leyendecker, German-American painter and illustrator (d. 1951)
1876 – Ziya Gökalp, Turkish sociologist, poet and activist (d. 1924)
  1876   – Thakin Kodaw Hmaing, Burmese poet, writer and political leader (d. 1964)
1878 – Franz Schreker, Austrian composer and conductor (d. 1934)
1880 – Heikki Ritavuori, Finnish lawyer and politician, Finnish Minister of the Interior (d. 1922)
1881 – Lacey Hearn, American sprinter (d. 1969)
  1881   – Roger Martin du Gard, French novelist and paleographer, Nobel Prize laureate (d. 1958)
  1881   – Hermann Staudinger, German chemist and academic, Nobel Prize laureate (d. 1965)
1882 – Emmy Noether, Jewish German-American mathematician, physicist and academic (d. 1935)
1884 – Joseph Boxhall, English sailor (d. 1967)
1885 – Platt Adams, American jumper and politician (d. 1961)
  1885   – Roque González Garza, Mexican general and acting president (1915) (d. 1962)
1886 – Frank Irons, American long jumper (d. 1942)
1887 – Josef Čapek, Czech painter and poet (d. 1945)
  1887   – Rudolf Kinau, German author (d. 1975)
  1887   – Juan Gris, Spanish painter and sculptor (d. 1927)
  1887   – Sidney Hillman, Lithuanian-born American labor leader (d. 1946)
1891 – Po Kya, Burmese author and educationist (d. 1942)
1893 – Cedric Gibbons, Irish-American art director and production designer (d. 1960)
  1893   – Gopalswamy Doraiswamy Naidu, Indian engineer and businessman (d. 1974)
1894 – Arthur Grimsdell, English international footballer and cricketer (d. 1963)
1895 – Encarnacion Alzona, Filipino historian and educator (d. 2001)
  1895   – Dane Rudhyar, French-American astrologer, author and composer (d. 1985)
1898 – Louis Adamic, Slovenian-American author, translator and politician (d. 1951)
  1898   – Madeleine de Bourbon-Busset, Duchess of Parma (d. 1984)
1899 – Dora Gerson, German actress and singer (d. 1943)
1900 – Erich Fromm, German psychologist and sociologist (d. 1980)

1901–present
1901 – Bon Maharaja, Indian guru and religious writer (d. 1982)
1903 – Frank Sargeson, New Zealand author (d. 1982)
1904 – Joan Crawford, American film actress (d. 1977)
1905 – Lale Andersen, German chanson singer-songwriter (d. 1972)
1907 – Daniel Bovet, Swiss-Italian pharmacologist and academic, Nobel Prize laureate (d. 1992)
1909 – Charles Werner, American cartoonist (d. 1997)
1910 – Jerry Cornes, English runner, colonial officer and educator (d. 2001)
  1910   – Akira Kurosawa, Japanese director, producer and screenwriter (d. 1998)
1912 – Eleanor Cameron, Canadian-American author and critic (d. 1996)
  1912   – Neil McCorkell, English-South African cricketer and coach (d. 2013)
  1912   – Wernher von Braun, German-American physicist and engineer (d. 1977)
1913 – Abidin Dino, Turko-French painter and illustrator (d. 1993)
1914 – Milbourne Christopher, American magician and author (d. 1984)
1915 – Mary Innes-Ker, Duchess of Roxburghe (d. 2014)
  1915   – Vasily Zaytsev, Russian captain (d. 1991)
1917 – Harry Cranbrook Allen, English historian (d. 1998)
1918 – Stanley Armour Dunham, American sergeant (d. 1992)
  1918   – Helene Hale, American politician (d. 2013)
  1918   – Naoki Kazu, Japanese football player (d.1940s)
1919 – Carl Graffunder, American architect and educator (d. 2013)
  1919   – Subhadra Joshi, Indian freedom activist and politician (d. 2003)
1920 – Neal Edward Smith, American pilot, lawyer and politician (d. 2021)
  1920   – Tetsuharu Kawakami, Japanese baseball player and manager (d. 2013)
1921 – Donald Campbell, English race car driver (d. 1967)
  1921   – Peter Lawler, Australian public servant (d. 2017)
1922 – Marty Allen, American comedian and actor (d. 2018)
  1922   – Ugo Tognazzi, Italian actor (d. 1990)
1923 – Angelo Ingrassia, American soldier and judge (d. 2013)
1924 – Rodney Mims Cook, Sr., American lieutenant and politician (d. 2013)
  1924   – Bette Nesmith Graham, American inventor, invented Liquid Paper (d. 1980)
  1924   – Olga Kennard, English crystallographer and academic (d. 2023)
  1924   – John Madin, English architect (d. 2012)
1925 – David Watkin, English cinematographer (d. 2008)
1929 – Roger Bannister, English runner, neurologist and academic (d. 2018)
  1929   – Michael Manser, English architect and engineer (d. 2016)
  1929   – Mark Rydell, American actor, director and producer
1931 – Yevgeny Grishin, Russian speed skater (d. 2005)
  1931   – Viktor Korchnoi, Russian chess player and author (d. 2016)
  1931   – Yevdokiya Mekshilo, Russian skier (d. 2013)
1932 – Don Marshall, Canadian ice hockey player
1933 – Norman Bailey, English opera singer and educator (d. 2021)
  1933   – Philip Zimbardo, American psychologist and academic
1934 – Ludvig Faddeev, Russian mathematician and physicist (d. 2017)
1935 – Barry Cryer, English comedian, actor and screenwriter (d. 2022)
1936 – Jannis Kounellis, Greek painter and sculptor (d. 2017)
1937 – Craig Breedlove, American race car driver
  1937   – Tony Burton, American actor, comedian, boxer and football player (d. 2016)
  1937   – Robert Gallo, American physician and academic
1938 – Jon Finlayson, Australian actor and screenwriter (d. 2012)
1942 – Michael Haneke, Austrian director, producer and screenwriter
  1942   – Jimmy Miller, American record producer and musician (d. 1994) 
  1942   – Walter Rodney, Guyanese historian, scholar and activist (d. 1980)
1943 – Andrew Crockett, Scottish-English economist and banker (d. 2012)
  1943   – Nils-Aslak Valkeapää, Finnish singer, author and director (d. 2001)
1944 – B. P. Gavrilov, Russian rugby player (d. 2006)
  1944   – Tony McPhee, English singer-songwriter and guitarist 
  1944   – Michael Nyman, English composer of minimalist music and pianist
  1944   – Ric Ocasek, American singer-songwriter, guitarist and producer (d. 2019)
1945 – Franco Battiato, Italian singer-songwriter and director (d. 2021)
  1945   – David Grisman, American mandolin player and composer 
1946 – Alan Bleasdale, English screenwriter and producer
1947 – Elizabeth Ann Scarborough, American author
1948 – Wasim Bari, Pakistani cricketer
  1948   – Marie Malavoy, German-Canadian educator and politician
1950 – Corinne Cléry, French actress
  1950   – Phil Lanzon, English keyboard player and songwriter 
  1950   – Ahdaf Soueif, Egyptian author and translator
1951 – Ron Jaworski, American football player and sportscaster
  1951   – Adrian Reynard, English businessman, founded Reynard Motorsport
1952 – Francesco Clemente, Italian painter and illustrator
  1952   – Kent Lambert, New Zealand rugby player 
  1952   – Kim Stanley Robinson, American author
  1952   – Rex Tillerson, American businessman, engineer and diplomat; 69th United States Secretary of State
1953 – Bo Díaz, Venezuelan baseball player (d. 1990)
  1953   – Chaka Khan, American singer-songwriter 
  1953   – Kiran Mazumdar-Shaw, Indian zoologist and businesswoman
1954 – Geno Auriemma, Italian-American basketball player and coach
  1954   – Kenneth Cole, American fashion designer, founded Kenneth Cole Productions
  1954   – Mary Fee, Scottish Labour Party politician
  1954   – Paul Price, English born, Welsh international footballer and manager
1955 – Moses Malone, American basketball player (d. 2015)
1956 – José Manuel Barroso, Portuguese academic and politician, 115th Prime Minister of Portugal
1957 – Lucio Gutiérrez, Ecuadorian politician, 52nd President of Ecuador
  1957   – Robbie James, Welsh footballer and manager (d. 1998)
  1957   – Amanda Plummer, American actress
1958 – Etienne De Wilde, Belgian cyclist
  1958   – Bengt-Åke Gustafsson, Swedish ice hockey player and coach
  1958   – Hugh Grant, Scottish business executive
1959 – Catherine Keener, American actress 
1960 – Nicol Stephen, Baron Stephen, Scottish lawyer and politician, 2nd Deputy First Minister of Scotland
  1960   – Haris Romas, Greek actor, screenwriter, and lyricist 
1961 – Roger Crisp, English philosopher and academic
  1961   – Craig Green, New Zealand rugby player
  1961   – Helmi Johannes, Indonesian journalist and producer
1962 – Steve Redgrave, English rower
1963 – Míchel, Spanish footballer and manager
  1963   – Juan Ramón López Caro, Spanish footballer and manager
  1963   – Ana Fidelia Quirot, Cuban runner
1964 – Hope Davis, American actress 
  1965   – Gary Whitehead, American poet and painter
1966 – Lorenzo Daniel, American sprinter
  1966   – Vasilis Vouzas, Greek footballer and manager
1968 – Damon Albarn, English singer-songwriter, producer and actor
  1968   – Mike Atherton, English cricketer and journalist
  1968   – Fernando Hierro, Spanish footballer and manager
  1968   – Pierre Palmade, French actor and screenwriter
1971 – Yasmeen Ghauri, Canadian model
  1971   – Gail Porter, Scottish model and television host
  1971   – Alexander Selivanov, Russian ice hockey player
  1971   – Hiroyoshi Tenzan, Japanese wrestler
1972 – Jonas Björkman, Swedish-Monégasque tennis player and coach
  1972   – Joe Calzaghe, Welsh boxer
  1972   – Judith Godrèche, French actress and author
1973 – Jerzy Dudek, Polish footballer
  1973   – Wim Eyckmans, Belgian race car driver
  1973   – Jason Kidd, American basketball player and coach
1974 – Mark Hunt, New Zealand mixed martial artist
  1974   – Randall Park, American actor, director and screenwriter
1975 – Burak Gürpınar, Turkish drummer 
  1975   – Andy Turner, English footballer and manager
1976 – Chris Hoy, Scottish cyclist
  1976   – Smriti Irani, Indian actress, producer and politician, Indian Minister of Human Resource Development
  1976   – Dougie Lampkin, English motorcycle racer
  1976   – Michelle Monaghan, American actress
  1976   – Joel Peralta, Dominican baseball player
  1976   – Keri Russell, American actress 
  1976   – Ricardo Zonta, Brazilian race car driver
  1976   – Sa Beining, Chinese host
1977 – Miklos Perlus, Canadian actor and screenwriter
1978 – Simon Gärdenfors, Swedish illustrator
  1978   – Perez Hilton, American blogger
  1978   – Liu Ye, Chinese actor
  1978   – Walter Samuel, Argentinian footballer
1979 – Mark Buehrle, American baseball player
  1979   – Donncha O'Callaghan, Irish rugby player
1981 – Erin Crocker, American race car driver
  1981   – Tony Peña Jr., Dominican baseball player
  1981   – Shelley Rudman, English bobsledder
  1981   – Giuseppe Sculli, Italian footballer
  1981   – Brett Young, American country music singer
1982 – José Contreras Arrau, Chilean footballer
  1982   – Andrea Musacco, Italian footballer
  1982   – Evgeni Striganov, Estonian ice dancer
1983 – Hakan Balta, Turkish footballer
  1983   – Mo Farah, Somali-English runner
  1983   – Sascha Riether, German international footballer
  1983   – Jerome Thomas, English footballer
1984 – Ryan Araña, Filipino basketball player
  1984   – Brandon Marshall, American football player
1985 – Maurice Jones-Drew, American football player
  1985   – Bethanie Mattek-Sands, American tennis player
1986 – Patrick Bordeleau, Canadian ice hockey player
  1986   – Andrea Dovizioso, Italian motorcycle racer
  1986   – Brett Eldredge, American singer-songwriter and guitarist
  1986   – Kangana Ranaut, Indian actress
1987 – Alan Toovey, Australian footballer
1988 – Dellin Betances, American baseball player
  1988   – Jason Kenny, English cyclist
  1988   – Michal Neuvirth, Czech ice hockey player
1989 – Ayesha Curry, Canadian-American chef, author and television personality
  1989   – Nikola Gulan, Serbian footballer
  1989   – Sarah McKenna, English rugby player
  1989   – Luis Fernando Silva, Mexican footballer
1990 – Jaime Alguersuari, Spanish race car driver
  1990   – Robert Zickert, German footballer
1991 – Linline Matauatu, Vanuatuan beach volleyball player
  1991   – Gregg Wylde, Scottish footballer
1992 – Tolga Ciğerci, German-Turkish footballer
  1992   – Kyrie Irving, Australian-American basketball player
1993 – Kyle Lovett, Australian rugby league player
  1993   – Aytaç Kara, Turkish footballer
1994 – Nick Powell, English footballer
1995 – Kevin Kauber, Estonian footballer
  1995   – Jan Lisiecki, Canadian pianist
  1995   – Ozan Tufan, Turkish footballer
1996 – Alexander Albon, Thai-British race car driver
  1996   – Joel Kiviranta, Finnish ice hockey player

Deaths

Pre-1600
59  – Agrippina the Younger, Roman empress (b. 15)
851 – Zhou Chi, Chinese historian and politician (b. 793)
1022 – Zhen Zong, Chinese emperor (b. 968)
1103 – Eudes I, duke of Burgundy (b. 1058)
1361 – Henry of Grosmont, 1st Duke of Lancaster, English politician, Lord High Steward of England (b. 1310)
1369 – Peter, king of Castile and León (b. 1334)
1483 – Yolande, duchess of Lorraine (b. 1428)
1548 – Itagaki Nobukata, Japanese samurai (b. 1489)
1555 – Julius III, pope of the Catholic Church (b. 1487)
1559 – Gelawdewos, Ethiopian emperor (b. 1521)
1596 – Henry Unton, English diplomat (b. 1557)

1601–1900
1606 – Justus Lipsius, Flemish philologist and scholar (b. 1547)
1618 – James Hamilton, 1st Earl of Abercorn, Scottish police officer and politician (b. 1575)
1629 – Francis Fane, 1st Earl of Westmorland, English landowner and politician (b. 1580)
1675 – Anthoni van Noordt, Dutch organist and composer (b. 1619)
1680 – Nicolas Fouquet, French politician (b. 1615)
1712 – Zebi Hirsch Kaidanover, Lithuanian-born rabbi and writer (b. c. 1650)
1742 – Jean-Baptiste Dubos, French historian and author (b. 1670)
1747 – Claude Alexandre de Bonneval, French general (b. 1675)
1748 – Johann Gottfried Walther, German organist and composer (b. 1684)
1754 – Johann Jakob Wettstein, Swiss theologian and critic (b. 1693)
1783 – Charles Carroll, English barrister and politician (b. 1723)
1792 – Luís António Verney, Portuguese philosopher and pedagogue (b. 1713)
1801 – Paul I, Russian emperor (b. 1754)
1842 – Stendhal, French novelist (b. 1783)
1862 – Manuel Robles Pezuela, Unconstitutional Mexican interim president, 1858–1859 (b. 1817) 
1883 – Arthur Macalister, Scottish-Australian politician, 2nd Premier of Queensland (b. 1818)
1884 – Henry C. Lord, American businessman (b. 1824)

1901–present
1910 – Nadar, French photographer, journalist, and author (b. 1820)
1914 – Rafqa Pietra Choboq Ar-Rayès, Lebanese saint (b. 1832)
1923 – Hovhannes Tumanyan, Armenian poet and author (b. 1869)
1927 – Paul César Helleu, French painter and etcher (b. 1859)
1931 – Shivaram Rajguru, Indian activist (b. 1908)
  1931   – Bhagat Singh, Indian activist (b. 1907)
  1931   – Sukhdev Thapar, Indian activist (b. 1907)
1946 – Gilbert N. Lewis, American chemist (b. 1875)
1953 – Raoul Dufy, French painter and illustrator (b. 1877)
  1953   – Oskar Luts, Estonian author and playwright (b. 1887)
1955 – Arthur Bernardes, Brazilian politician, 12th President of Brazil (b. 1875)
1960 – Franklin Pierce Adams, American journalist and author (b. 1881)
  1960   – Said Nursî, Turkish theologian and scholar (b. 1878)
1961 – Albert Bloch, American painter and educator (b. 1882)
  1961   – Jack Russell, English cricketer (b. 1887)
1963 – Thoralf Skolem, Norwegian mathematician and logician (b. 1887)
1964 – Peter Lorre, American actor (b. 1904)
1965 – Mae Murray, American actress, dancer, producer, and screenwriter (b. 1885)
1968 – Edwin O'Connor, American journalist and author (b. 1918)
1972 – Cristóbal Balenciaga, Spanish fashion designer, founded Balenciaga (b. 1895)
1978 – Haim Ernst Wertheimer, Israeli biochemist and academic (b. 1893)
  1978   – Halyna Kuzmenko, Ukrainian teacher and anarchist revolutionary (b. 1897)
1979 – Ted Anderson, English footballer (b. 1911)
1980 – Arthur Melvin Okun, American economist and academic (b. 1928)
1981 – Beatrice Tinsley, English-New Zealand astronomer and cosmologist (b. 1941)
1981 – Mike Hailwood, English motorcyclist (b. 1940)
1985 – Richard Beeching, Baron Beeching, English physicist and engineer (b. 1913)
1985 – Peter Charanis, Greek-American scholar and educator (b. 1908)
1986 – Moshe Feinstein, American Orthodox Rabbi and posek (b. 1895)
1987 – Olev Roomet, Estonian singer and violinist (b. 1901)
1990 – John Dexter, English director and producer (b. 1925)
1991 – Margaret Atwood Judson, American historian and author (b. 1899)
  1991   – Parkash Singh, Indian soldier, Victoria Cross recipient (b. 1913)
1992 – Friedrich Hayek, Austrian-German economist, philosopher, and academic, Nobel Prize laureate (b. 1899)
  1992   – Ron Lapointe, Canadian ice hockey player and coach (b. 1949)
1994 – Luis Donaldo Colosio, Mexican economist and politician (b. 1950)
  1994   – Giulietta Masina, Italian actress (b. 1921)
1995 – Davie Cooper, Scottish footballer and coach (b. 1956)
1999 – Luis María Argaña, Paraguayan judge and politician, Vice President of Paraguay (b. 1932)
  1999   – Osmond Borradaile, Canadian director and cinematographer (b. 1898)
2001 – Rowland Evans, American journalist (b. 1921)
  2001   – Margaret Jones, British archaeologist (b. 1916)
  2001   – Robert Laxalt, American author (b. 1923)
  2001   – David McTaggart, Canadian badminton player and environmentalist (b. 1932)
2002 – Eileen Farrell, American soprano (b. 1920)
  2002   – Ben Hollioake, Australian-English cricketer (b. 1977)
2003 – Fritz Spiegl, Austrian-English flute player and journalist (b. 1926)
2004 – Rupert Hamer, Australian soldier, lawyer, and politician, 39th Premier of Victoria (b. 1916)
2006 – David B. Bleak, American sergeant, Medal of Honor recipient (b. 1932)
  2006   – Desmond Doss, American soldier, Medal of Honor recipient (b. 1919)
  2006   – Cindy Walker, American singer-songwriter and dancer (b. 1918)
2007 – Paul Cohen, American mathematician and theorist (b. 1934)
  2007   – Eric Medlen, American race car driver (b. 1973)
2008 – Vaino Vahing, Estonian psychiatrist, author, and playwright (b. 1940)
2009 – Ghukas Chubaryan, Armenian sculptor (b. 1923)
  2009   – Raúl Macías, Mexican boxer and trainer (b. 1934)
2011 – Jean Bartik, American computer scientist and engineer (b. 1924)
  2011   – Rosario Morales, Puerto Rican poet and writer (b.1930)
  2011   – Elizabeth Taylor, American-British actress, socialite and humanitarian (b. 1932)
2012 – Abdullahi Yusuf Ahmed, Somalian politician, President of Somalia (b. 1934)
  2012   – Jim Duffy, American animator, director, and producer (b. 1937)
  2012   – Naji Talib, Iraqi politician, 52nd Prime Minister of Iraq (b. 1917)
  2012   – Lonnie Wright, American basketball and football player (b. 1945)
2013 – Boris Berezovsky, Russian-born Soviet-British mathematician and businessman (b. 1946)
  2013   – Onofre Corpuz, Filipino economist, historian, and academic (b. 1926)
  2013   – Virgil Trucks, American baseball player and coach (b. 1917)
  2013   – Joe Weider, Canadian-American bodybuilder and publisher, co-founded the International Federation of BodyBuilding & Fitness (b. 1919)
2014 – Dave Brockie, Canadian-American singer-songwriter and bass player (b. 1963)
  2014   – Jaroslav Šerých, Czech painter and illustrator (b. 1928)
  2014   – Adolfo Suárez, Spanish lawyer and politician, 1st Prime Minister of Spain (b. 1932)
2015 – Gian Vittorio Baldi, Italian director, producer, and screenwriter (b. 1930)
  2015   – Lee Kuan Yew, Singaporean lawyer and politician, 1st Prime Minister of Singapore (b. 1923)
  2015   – Bobby Lowther, American basketball player and lieutenant (b. 1923)
  2015   – Lil' Chris, English singer-songwriter, actor, and television personality (b. 1990)
2016 – Joe Garagiola, Sr., American baseball player and sportscaster (b. 1926)
  2016   – Ken Howard, American actor (b. 1944)
2021 – George Segal, American actor (b. 1934)
2022 – Madeleine Albright, Czechoslovakian-born American diplomat, 64th United States Secretary of State (b. 1937)

Holidays and observances
 Christian feast day:
Gregory the Illuminator (Episcopal Church)
 Gwinear
 Joseph Oriol
 Ottone Frangipane
 Rafqa Pietra Choboq Ar-Rayès (Maronite Church)
 Turibius of Mogrovejo
 Victorian, Frumentius and Companions
 March 23 (Eastern Orthodox liturgics)
 Day of Hungarian-Polish Friendship (Hungary and Poland)
 Day of the Sea (Bolivia)
 Family Day (South Africa)
 Ministry of Environment and Natural Resources Day (Azerbaijan)
 Pakistan Day (Pakistan)
 Promised Messiah Day (Ahmadiyya)
 World Meteorological Day

References

External links

 BBC: On This Day
 
 Historical Events on March 23

Days of the year
March